German submarine U-55 was a Type VIIB U-boat of Nazi Germany's Kriegsmarine during World War II. She was ordered on 16 July 1937 and laid down on 2 November 1938 at Friedrich Krupp Germaniawerft in Kiel as yard number 590. Launched on 19 October 1939, she went into service on 21 November 1939 under the command of Kapitänleutnant (Kptlt.) Werner Heidel.

Design
German Type VIIB submarines were preceded by the shorter Type VIIA submarines. U-55 had a displacement of  when at the surface and  while submerged. She had two shafts and two  propellers.

U-55 was fitted with five  torpedo tubes (four fitted at the bow and one at the stern), fourteen torpedoes, one  SK C/35 naval gun, 220 rounds, and one  anti-aircraft gun The boat had a complement of between forty-four and sixty.

Service history
She sank four small freighters sailing independently, then attacked convoy OA-80G on 29 January. U-55 sank two more ships before coming under concerted attack from the convoy's escorts, supported by a Sunderland flying boat from RAF Coastal Command 228 Squadron.

Fate
After a sustained depth charge attack, the U-boat surfaced and carried out a running gun battle before her deck gun jammed. Heidel ordered the boat to be abandoned, then apparently went down with it. The remainder of the crew was rescued by the escorts. The British awarded official credit for sinking U-55 to the sloop , the destroyer , French destroyers Valmy and Guépard, and the Sunderland.

Summary of raiding history

References

Bibliography

External links

1939 ships
German Type VIIB submarines
Ships built in Kiel
U-boats commissioned in 1939
U-boats sunk by British aircraft
U-boats sunk by British warships
U-boats sunk by French warships
U-boats sunk in 1940
World War II shipwrecks in the Atlantic Ocean
World War II submarines of Germany
Maritime incidents in January 1940